Nikaah ( marriage contract) is a 1982 Indian Hindi-language romantic drama film produced and directed by B. R. Chopra. The film stars Raj Babbar, Deepak Parashar and Salma Agha in her Bollywood movie debut role. The film also had Asrani and   Iftekhar in supporting roles. The film's music was composed by Ravi and was a huge hit.  The original name of the movie was Talaq Talaq Talaq, but was renamed Nikaah on the insistence of Islamic clerics. The film won Filmfare Award for Best Dialogue and Filmfare Award for Best Female Playback Singer in 1983. It was the sixth highest grossing Bollywood film of 1982.

Plot
In Nikaah, B.R Chopra makes a social comment on the sharia laws of divorce (Talaq) and its misuse in Indian Muslim society.

Haider (Raj Babbar) and Nilofar (Salma Agha) are students in the Osmania University. Haider, an aspiring  poet, falls in love with Nilofar without knowing she is already engaged to Wasim (Deepak Parashar), who is a Nawab. Nilofar and Wasim eventually marry while Haider becomes a successful poet and editor of a magazine.

After marriage, Nilofar learns that Wasim is a workaholic and also has the tendency of picking up fights on petty issues. During their honeymoon, Wasim gets a new business contract and spends most of his time at work. Nilofar, who was expecting a blissful married life is disappointed and feels neglected and lonely. Wasim repeatedly fails to keep his promises to Nilofar and keeps her in waiting on numerous occasions, often leaving her in tears. On the occasion of their first wedding anniversary, Wasim and Nilofar arrange a party for which Wasim fails to turn up. Nilofar can't face the guests and retires to her bedroom. The guests feel insulted by the absence of the hosts and leave the party. This leads to a heated argument between the couple and in a moment of rage Wasim divorces Nilofar by saying Talaq three times.

Nilofar, now a divorcee is offered a job by Haider in his magazine. During this period she realizes Haider is still in love with her. Wasim who has divorced her in a moment of anger, wants to reconcile and marry her again. He approaches the Imam and asks his advice on the matter. The Imam tells him the complexity of the Sharia law of Nikah halala for remarrying a woman after divorcing her. This requires her to marry someone else, consummate the union and get a divorce later. Only then will Wasim be able to remarry Nilofar.

During this time Haider expresses his love towards Nilofar and his desire to marry her. They marry with the consent of their parents. Wasim sends a letter to Nilofar asking her to divorce Haider and marry him. Haider reads this letter and thinks that Nilofar and Wasim are still in love. He decides to offer her a divorce, so that she can marry Wasim. He brings Wasim to her and offers his consent to divorce her through Talaq. But Nilofar turns it down and questions both of them on their treating of her like a property rather than as a woman. She says she wants to continue her life with Haider. Wasim gives them his blessing and leaves.

Cast
Raj Babbar as Afaque Haider
Salma Agha as Nilofar Haider
Deepak Parashar as Wasim Ahmed 
Asrani as Saif
 Iftekhar as Jumman chacha
Ghulam Ali (singer) as the Item singer

Production

Filming
Major part of Nikaah was filmed in multiple locations in Hyderabad - Osmania University, Eat Street or Necklace Road (Hussain Sagar), Government Nizamia Tibbi College located near Charminar, Shahi Masjid in Public Gardens and Ravindra Bharathi auditorium.

Music

Awards and nominations

|-
| rowspan="11"|1982
| Salma Agha (for "Dil Ke Armaan")
| Best Female Playback Singer
| rowspan="2"
|-
| Dr. Achla Nagar
| Best Dialogue
|-
| rowspan="2"|B. R. Chopra
| Best Film
| rowspan="9"
|-
| Best Director
|-
| Salma Agha
| Best Actress
|-
| Dr. Achla Nagar
| Best Story
|-
| Ravi
| Best Music Director
|-
| Hassan Kamaal (for "Dil Ke Armaan")
| rowspan="2"|Best Lyricist
|-
| Hassan Kamaal (for "Dil Ki Ke Yeh Arzoo")
|-
| Salma Agha (for "Faza Bhi Hai Jawan")
| rowspan="2"|Best Female Playback Singer
|-
| Salma Agha (for "Dil Ki Yeh Arzoo")
|}

References

External links 
 
 Nikaah film on YouTube

1982 films
1980s Hindi-language films
Films set in Hyderabad, India
Films about women in India
Films directed by B. R. Chopra
Films scored by Ravi